Celle di San Vito is a town and comune in the province of Foggia of the Apulia region in southern Italy.

Located upon the Daunian Mountains, Celle di San Vito is by far the smallest municipality in Apulia. Unlike the residents of many bordering towns (Biccari, Castelluccio Valmaggiore, Orsara di Puglia and Troia), people of Celle di San Vito and the neighboring village of Faeto speak Faetar, a rare daughter language of the Franco-Provençal language which has fewer than 1,400 known speakers. The town's language is also represented in Brantford, Ontario, Canada, which received many immigrants from Celle di San Vito beginning in the early 1950s.  At its peak several hundred daily speakers used the language in Brantford.  As of 2012, the daily speakers have dwindled to fewer than 50 spread over three generations.

References

External links
 Official site of the municipality
 Colonia Francoprovenzale Celle di San Vito, Franco-Provençal cultural association of Puglia in Piemonte, Franco-Provençal orthography guide, history, and local information. (Italian and Franco-Provençal)

Cities and towns in Apulia